Kabaddi made its first appearance as an exhibition sport at the 1982 and became an Asian Games event since 1990 in Beijing, China. Until the 2018 edition, India always dominated the event by winning highest number of gold medals in both men's and women's category.

Summary

Men

Women

Medal table

Participating nations

Men

Women

List of medalists

References

External links
Medallists from previous Asian Games - Kabbadi

 
Sports at the Asian Games
Asian Games